Charles Antoine, Count of La Roche-Aymon, born at Mainsat (Marche) on 17 February 1697 and died in Paris on 27 October 1777, was a French prelate, cardinal and grand aumônier de France.

La Roche-Aymon was born in the diocese of Limoges in 1696, and had a doctorate in theology (Paris 1724). He was a Canon of Mâcon, and served as Vicar-General of Limoges. He had been titular Bishop of Sarepta and Auxiliary Bishop of Limoges (1725–1730), Bishop of Tarbes (1730–1740), Archbishop of Toulouse (1740–1752), and Archbishop of Narbonne (1752–1763). He was nominated Archbishop of Reims by King Louis XV on 5 December 1762, and was approved (preconized) on 24 January 1763 by Pope Clement XIII. He was created a cardinal on 16 December 1771 by Pope Clement XIV.

A member of the assemblies of the clergy in 1735, 1740, 1745, and 1748, he presided over them from 1760. In 1770, Louis XV, the dean of the bishops of France in 1770, a courtier and a conciliator, appointed him minister of the profits sheet after the disgrace of M. de Jarente.

He administered the sacraments to Louis XV., Dying on 10 May 1774. On 16 May 1770 he had married Versailles Louis, dauphin of France, to Marie Antoinette, Archduchess of Austria, then became Louis XVI. France at Reims on 11 June 1775.

Charles Antoine de La Roche-Aymon was also elected as the maintainer of the Floral Games Academy in 1742.

He died on 27 October 1777.

References

18th-century French cardinals
1697 births
1777 deaths